The Urft is a  right-hand tributary of the Rur in the county of Euskirchen in the German state of  North Rhine-Westphalia. It flows through the village of Urft in the municipality of Kall. The Urft rises in the North Eifel region of the Eifel Mountains.

Origin of the name 
The name of the Urft is derived from Urd-apa. The origin of the word Urd is unknown, but apa is Celtic and means "stream". In 1075, the Urft was called the Urdefa, in 1419 the Orfft and, in 1503, the Oyrfft. The village of Urft takes its name from the river.

Course 
The Urft rises in the North Eifel in the High Fens-Eifel Nature Park.

The Urft initially flows through Schmidtheim. From there it is accompanied by the Eifel Line and joined by the Dänenbach stream. It then flows through the village of Blankenheim-Wald, where it collects the Wisselbach and is crossed by the B 258 federal highway. In the next section it is joined by more streams including the Treisbach, the Laufbach and the Haubach. At Steinrütsch, which lies in the parish of Nettersheim and where there are the remains of a Roman burgus and castellum (Kleinkastell), it is joined by the Wellenbach in Urft and in Nettersheim the Genfbach. Next the river runs parallel to the Roman Eifel Aqueduct, which begins at the old Gronrecht Mill (Gronrechtsmühle) near the Grüner Pütz, flows through Urft, where it meets the Gillesbach and, below the village, the Kuttenbach. After that the Urft flows through Sötenich and Kall, where it leaves both the Eifel Line and the Eifel Aqueduct and collects the Kallbach, before running along the Olef Valley Railway and through Anstois. Next it passes through Gemünd, where the Olef joins and where the B 265 and B 266 cross the Urft in the village. It then leaves the railway and flows through Malsbenden.

Next the Urft flows into the Urft Reservoir, which channels its waters usually into a tunnel - the Kermeter Gallery - through the Kermeter ridge north of the reservoir and through the turbines of the Heimbach Power Station with its outflow into the compensating basin of the Heimbach Dam and thus eventually into the Rur. Through this artificial outflow tunnel the mouth of the Urft is near the Heimbach village of Hasenfeld at Rur . Before the construction of the Urft Dam, the river emptied in a natural way above the  Simmerath village of Rurberg roughly at Rur  into the Rur. From there the reservoir waters flow, at high water, over the spillway of the Urft Dam.

Catchment area and tributaries 

See also
List of rivers of North Rhine-Westphalia

References

Literature 
 Hans Peter Schiffer: Das Urfttal in der Eifel. Landschaft, Natur, Geschichte. 2nd edn., LandpresseRegio, Weilerswist, 2006.

External links 

Rivers of North Rhine-Westphalia
Rivers of the Eifel
Rivers of Germany